Thomas Wilberforce Fletcher (1878 – after 1902) was an English professional footballer who played in the Football League for  Small Heath.

Born in Wednesfield, Staffordshire, Fletcher joined Second Division club Small Heath from Willenhall in 1900. He made his debut – as the third of five players used at inside left in the 1900–01 season – on 29 December 1900 in a 2–1 home win against Burslem Port Vale. Fletcher kept his place for the next game, but failed to impress, and returned to non-league football in the Black Country. He died in Wolverhampton.

References

1878 births
Year of death missing
People from Wednesfield
English footballers
Association football inside forwards
Willenhall F.C. players
Birmingham City F.C. players
Cradley Heath F.C. players
English Football League players
Date of birth missing